Gunah Bakhan (also Romanized as Gūnah Bākhān) is a village in Quri Chay-ye Gharbi Rural District, Saraju District, Maragheh County, East Azerbaijan Province, Iran. At the 2006 census, its population was 84, in 20 families.

References 

Towns and villages in Maragheh County